Tegrodera aloga, the iron cross blister beetle, is a species of blister beetle in the family Meloidae. It is found in Central America and North America.

The species name T. aloga was coined by Skinner in 1903. It refers to the black cross on the wing covers.

Description
Tegrodera aloga is generally about 2 cm long; it has a long, narrow and cylindrical body and a wide head. The beetle is easily recognizable due to its contrasting yellow and red spots found on its black body. The brightness of the spots warns of the cantharidin toxins the beetle carries; this coloration is known as aposematism, and it works as a warning signal to protect itself from predators. It is more common to find these beetles in larger groups rather than individually. The beetles in the photograph are actually Tegrodera latecincta, but this species is almost identical to that species.

Behavior

Time of activity varies, with certain individuals active at night, and some by day. Since adults are gregarious and brightly colored, they are conspicuous. The main foodplant of Tegrodera aloga is palo verde trees and they usually lay their eggs at the base of the flower buds. The eggs then tend to hatch when the flower bud opens. At this stage, the larvae (triungulins) wait for a male bee and climb onto him. He then mates with a female. The larvae climb onto the female during mating, and the female (unknowingly) gives them a ride back to her nest. The larvae then resorb their legs, and eat the bee larvae, along with the provisions stored for the larval bee. They pupate in the nest and emerge as adults the next spring. In Tegrodera aloga, the males fight among themselves for the ability to mate with a female. Mating takes place actively, with the male on the female's back. Together they climb among flowers and leaves. They will consume miniature wollystar, alfalfa, and other desert plants. They will drink nectar as well.

Larval Instars

1st: Larva is a triungulin, which is highly active, mobile, and flattened. Larva hitches ride on female bee; bee goes to nest. 

2nd through pupal stage: Larva resorbs (loses) legs, and feeds on bee food and larvae.

Diet
Adult iron cross blister beetles eat the flowers of Nama hispidum and Eriastrum spp.

Relationship to humans and livestock
In Tegrodera aloga, cantharidin is excreted through the leg joints and the antennal pores. It is toxic to humans and can inflict painful and sometimes fatal injury to certain livestock. This chemical, C10H12O4, causes severe skin blisters (dermatosis) within hours after exposure. The insect secretes this substance as a defense mechanism. Crushing the beetle also releases the cantharidin.

Cantharidin is a poisonous substance which can prove fatal if ingested. The lethal dose for humans when ingested is 10 mg, or 0.5 mg/kg of a human's body weight. The main concern revolves around when the beetle is ingested by livestock, in particular horses. The lethal dose for horses is 1 mg/kg. Iron cross blister beetles are known to be found in horses’ food, especially alfalfa. These beetles are starting to pose a problem for farmers in California due to them being “killed during harvest and incorporated into baled hay, or indirectly by transfer of the hemolymph from crushed beetles onto forage.”

This beetle is also considered beneficial because cantharidin is used in the medical field as a topical medication in the removal of warts, removal of tattoos, and has even been looked into for certain cancer treatments.  Its use in the treatment of removing warts has been common for many years, and is still used by dermatologists.

References

 Blaisdell SR., Frank E. "SYNOPSIS OF THE GENUS TEGRODERA. (Order, Coleoptera; Family, Meloidæ.)." THE CANADIAN ENTOMOLOGIST 50.10 (1918): 333-35. Web. 16 Apr. 2015. .
 "Detailed record for Tegrodera aloga Skinner, 1903." Essig Museum of Entomology Species Lists. N.p., n.d. Web. 16 Apr. 2015. .

Further reading

 
 

Meloidae
Articles created by Qbugbot
Beetles described in 1903
Beetles of Africa